The Australian Subscription Library was the first library to exist outside of private collections in Australia. Started in 1826 as the 'Sydney Australian Subscription Library and Reading Room' it shortened its name to the 'Australian Subscription Library' in 1834, and then in 1853 changed its name to the 'Australian Library and Literary Institute’. Its assets were brought by the Government of New South Wales in 1869, and it became the 'Free Public Library. As the collections and services provided by the 'Free Public Library' expanded it became the State Library of New South Wales, which includes the Mitchell and Dixon library collections.

History
On 13 March 1826, an elite group of gentlemen rendezvoused at the Sydney Hotel to set up the 'Sydney Australian Subscription Library and Reading Room'. Agreeing to abide by a  strict set of rules for loaning, reading and purchase of books they also paid a £5 admission fee and £2 per year for a continued membership. The Library's first reading room was opened at No. 1, Terry's Buildings in Pitt Street, Sydney in December 1827.

In 1831, Governor Ralph Darling gifted the Library the two building allotments located in Hyde Park for a new library building and two allotments in the area of Rushcutters Bay to be sold for funding the library's development. The Library moved to the Old Sydney Post Office on George Street in December, 1831.

On 29 July 1834, an Act was passed which allowed the library to own land and sell shares and changed its name to the “Australian Subscription Library.” Around this time there were offers to erect a permanent building for the Library at the government's expense but this was turned down as the members forwent their claim to the site of building allotment. Ironically Governor Richard Bourke's preferred location was close to where the Library would later be built, as it was in the Government Domain,

In May 1836, while expressing its unhappiness about the location of their new building, they were forced to move to upper floor Chief Justice Francis Forbes' residence, at Bridge and Gresham streets. In May 1840 they sold the allotments in Hyde Park and Rushcutters Bay to raise money to start work on a new building at Bent and Macquarie Streets. Commenced in 1843 it was finally completed in November 1845. And became the first permanent building specifically designed to house the collections.

 According to long-term member George Miller, this was done to imitate similar institutions in England and create a body of shareholders, "who would, in fact, be the holders of the property, and thus become interested in its welfare and advancement."

However, the limited number of shareholder caused ongoing financial difficulties for the library who finally decided in 1869 to offer the building and books to the Government to clear their debts.  On 22 September 1869, the government bought for £1500 the Library's books and also rented their building for 12 months at £800 in advance, also holding the right to buy that building for £4000 or over.

Mr Walker, the Inspector of Public Charities, was appointed its new Librarian, while Mr Hawley, the old Librarian, was appointed as his assistant. The new libraries collections included transfers of books and records held in other Government Departments and the addition of the Judge Wise collection of Australian material. On 30 September the building reopened as the Free Public Library with the new management. After 40 years work, there was a library in Sydney with free access to magazines, journals and books.

Further reading
Bladen, F. (1911). Historical notes: Public Library of New South Wales / by F.M. Bladen. (2nd ed.). Sydney: W. A. Gullick, Govt. Printer., State Library of New South Wales, 027.5/B

Australian Subscription Library, & Australian Library Literary Institution. (1826). Rules and regulations for the conduct of the Australian Subscription Library and Reading Room : Approved at a general meeting held on 16 March. Sydney: Printed at the Gazette Office, by R.Howe, State Library of New South Wales, DSM/C 447

Australian Library Literary Institution, Australian Subscription Library, & Free Public Library. (1866). Catalogue of books recently added to the Australian Library and Literary Institution, Bent street, Sydney, 1866. Sydney, N.S.W.: A.W. Douglas, State Library of New South Wales, 019.2/1

The Mitchell Library, Sydney. Historical and descriptive notes', 1936, State Library of New South Wales, MLMSS 72

Barker, G., Origins of the State Library of New South Wales 1826-1869, State Library of New South Wales, 2017, Online Stories

Citations

Libraries in New South Wales
1826 establishments in Australia
1869 disestablishments
Subscription libraries in Australia
Libraries established in 1826